Koma is a genus of cicadas with an afrotropical distribution.

References

Taxa named by William Lucas Distant
Cicadidae genera
Platypleurini